Yoo Ho-joon (born January 14, 1985) is a South Korean football player who currently plays for Gyeongnam FC.

References

External links

1985 births
Living people
South Korean footballers
Ulsan Hyundai FC players
Busan IPark players
Gyeongnam FC players
Ansan Mugunghwa FC players
K League 1 players
K League 2 players
Association football midfielders